That Night With You is a 1945 American comedy film directed by William A. Seiter and starring Susanna Foster, Franchot Tone and Louise Allbritton. Produced and distributed by Universal Pictures, it featured Buster Keaton in a supporting role.  At one stage the film used the working title Once Upon a Dream.

Cast
Franchot Tone as Paul Renaud
Susanna Foster as Penny Parker
David Bruce as Johnny
Louise Allbritton as Sheila Morgan
Jacqueline deWit as Blossom Drake
Irene Ryan as Prudence
Buster Keaton as Sam, a Short Order Cook
Howard Freeman as Wilbur Weedy
Barbara Sears as Clarissa
Teddy Infuhr as Bingo

References

Bibliography
 Neibaur, James L. The Fall of Buster Keaton: His Films for MGM, Educational Pictures, and Columbia. Scarecrow Press, 2010.

External links

1945 films
American comedy films
Films scored by Hans J. Salter
American black-and-white films
1945 comedy films
Films directed by William A. Seiter
1940s American films
1940s English-language films
Universal Pictures films